Morgan Carl Hamm (born September 24, 1982 in Washburn, Wisconsin) is an American artistic gymnast. He is an Olympic silver medalist in the team competition at the 2004 Olympics and a two-time Olympian (2000, 2004). He also was a member of the silver-medal winning team at the 2003 World Championships. Hamm was named to the 2008 Olympic team, but withdrew from it due to injury.

Personal life
Hamm is the son of Sandy and Cecily Hamm. His twin brother, Paul Hamm, is also a gymnast and is the 2004 Olympic All-Around Champion. His older sister, Elizabeth (Betsy), is a former member of USA Gymnastics Senior National Team. She competed for the University of Florida, where she became the NCAA’s national balance beam champion in 1998 and was a seven-time All-American. His father was an All-American springboard diver.

In 2010, Hamm enrolled at Concordia University Wisconsin to study pharmacology. In 2014, he successfully completed his studies and earned his Doctor of Pharmacy degree. He is currently a practicing Pharm.D.

Career
Hamm competed at the 2000 Olympics in Sydney at age 17, and the 2004 Summer Olympics in Athens, alongside his twin brother Paul. At the 2004 Olympics, he won the silver medal with the U.S. team in the team competition. Morgan's contribution to this medal-winning performance was vital as he performed on four of the six apparatus and was the highest scorer for the team on vault and high bar. He also competed in floor and high bar finals, and only a tie-breaker kept him from winning the bronze medal on the latter event. Morgan was also a member of the U.S. team at the 2003 World Championships that won a silver medal in the team competition.

In February 2007, Hamm announced that he would return to competitive gymnastics. He competed at the 2007 Visa National Championships, on floor and pommel horse. He competed at the 2008 National Championships and at the 2008 Olympic Trials. He was warned by the United States Anti-Doping Agency in July for testing positive for glucocorticosteroid, which is not performance-enhancing or banned but only allowed if proper paperwork is filed to document that the drug is used for therapeutic reasons. Hamm received the substance through an anti-inflammatory shot to his injured ankle but failed to file the paperwork and his results at the May 24 National Championships were thrown out. Hamm claimed that he had a legitimate medical need for the drug. He was ultimately selected for the 2008 Olympic team.  However, Hamm withdrew from the Olympics on August 7, 2008, due to an ankle injury. Alexander Artemev replaced him on the team.

Sasuke

Morgan Hamm also competed alongside his brother, Paul Hamm, in the two 2005 Sasuke competitions (#14, #15,). In the 14th competition he timed out before he could attempt the "Rope Climb" in the First Stage. In the 15th competition, he made it to the third stage and ultimately failed on the "Curtain Cling" obstacle. Unlike his brother, he did not compete in the 16th competition.

Airflare 

Morgan Hamm was the first person to officially introduce the B-Boy maneuver Airflare to gymnastics.

Competitive history

2008 season

2007 season

2004 season

2003 season

2002 season

2001 season

2000 season

References

External links
 
 
 
 
 
 Hamm twins video calendar

1982 births
Living people
People from Washburn, Wisconsin
American male artistic gymnasts
Gymnasts at the 2000 Summer Olympics
Gymnasts at the 2004 Summer Olympics
Identical twins
Ohio State Buckeyes men's gymnasts
Olympic silver medalists for the United States in gymnastics
Medalists at the World Artistic Gymnastics Championships
Sportspeople from Waukesha, Wisconsin
Doping cases in gymnastics
Sasuke (TV series) contestants
American twins
Twin sportspeople
Sportspeople from the Milwaukee metropolitan area
Concordia University Wisconsin alumni
Medalists at the 2004 Summer Olympics